Luigi Lonfernini (born 31 August 1938) was Captain Regent of San Marino in 1971 and 2001. He is also a lawyer and banker. He served as a member of the Sammarinese Christian Democratic Party. He received a law degree from the University of Bologna. He was elected as the Secretary for Finance from 1972 to 1973.

References

Captains Regent of San Marino
Members of the Grand and General Council
Living people
1938 births
Sammarinese Christian Democratic Party politicians
Secretaries of State for Finance of San Marino